tbi bank is a consumer and SME-focused bank with headquarters in Sofia, providing financial services in Bulgaria, Romania, Greece and trough digital channels in Germany, Denmark, and Poland. The bank is owned by TBIF Financial Services, a 4finance Holding company, since August 2016.

The bank has more than 1 million registered customers as of 2022 and operates through a partners’ network of close to 7,000 sales points.

History 
In 2002, TBIF Financial Services (TBIF), a former Kardan Group Dutch subsidiary, established TBI Credit in Bulgaria. It also set up additional companies, such as TBI Invest, TBI Leasing, TBI Rent and TBI Asset Management, creating one of the largest nonbanking networks in the country. 

In 2011, TBIF acquired the Bulgarian branch of Nova Ljubljanska Banka (Slovenia) and entered the banking sector. This led to the consolidation of the businesses and the birth of tbi bank.

In the last few years, tbi bank has been consistently ranked as one of the most effective banks in Bulgaria. In 2017, Capital ranked the Bank #1 in Efficiency & Profitability and Sustainability & Dynamics rankings of the special edition K10 "The Best Banks in Bulgaria".

See also 
List of banks in Europe

References

External links 

Banks of Bulgaria
Banks established in 2002
2002 establishments in Bulgaria